A Little Big Business is a British comedy television series which originally aired on ITV After a pilot episode in 1963, it was followed by two full series in 1964 and 1965. Several of the leading roles were recast after the pilot. A young man is taught about the furniture business by his father.

Guest stars included Warren Mitchell, Isa Miranda and Donal Donnelly.

Main cast
 David Kossoff as Marcus Lieberman
 Joyce Marlow as Miss Stevens
 Francis Matthews as Simon Lieberman
 David Conville as Basil Crane 
 Martin Miller as Lazlo
 Diana Coupland as Naomi Lieberman

References

Bibliography
 Halliwell, Lesslie. Halliwell's Teleguide. Unknown Publisher, 1979.
 Perry, Christopher . The British Television Pilot Episodes Research Guide 1936-2015. 2015.

External links
 

1964 British television series debuts
1965 British television series endings
1960s British comedy television series
ITV sitcoms
English-language television shows
Television shows produced by Granada Television